Sumedha Gunawathie Jayasena (සුමේධා ගුණවතී ජයසේන) is a Sri Lankan politician, a member of the Parliament of Sri Lanka and a government cabinet minister.
Dr. Sumedha G. Jayasena is the Minister of Parliamentary affairs  of Sri Lanka, aged 62. Sumedha G. Jyasena, has held various cabinet ministerial positions over the 25 continuous years of her political career. She has been doing an enormous service to her Constituency 'Monaragala' over the years. She contributed massively to the rehabilitation/rebuild process after the devastating 2004 tsunami in Sri Lanka as the Minister of social services.

Political career

1989-1994   Member of Parliament Monaragala District
1994-1999    Deputy Minister of Buddhist Affairs
1999-2005    Minister of Social Services 
2005-2010    Minister of Women's Affairs/Empowerment 
2010–present  Minister of Parliamentary Affairs

References
 

Living people
Members of the 10th Parliament of Sri Lanka
Members of the 11th Parliament of Sri Lanka
Members of the 12th Parliament of Sri Lanka
Members of the 13th Parliament of Sri Lanka
Members of the 14th Parliament of Sri Lanka
Government ministers of Sri Lanka
Sri Lanka Freedom Party politicians
United People's Freedom Alliance politicians
Sri Lanka Podujana Peramuna politicians
1952 births
Women legislators in Sri Lanka
Social affairs ministers of Sri Lanka
20th-century Sri Lankan women politicians
21st-century Sri Lankan women politicians
Women government ministers of Sri Lanka